Michel Auguste Dupoty (1797–1864) was a French journalist and a politician with republican beliefs.  He took part in publishing several republican-democratic newspapers.

References

1797 births
1864 deaths
French republicans
19th-century French politicians
French journalists
French male non-fiction writers